Lifestyles of the Rich and Famous is an American television series that aired in syndication from 1984 to 1995. The show featured the extravagant lifestyles of wealthy entertainers, athletes, socialites and magnates.

It was hosted by Robin Leach for the majority of its run. When Leach was joined by Shari Belafonte in 1994, the show was renamed Lifestyles with Robin Leach and Shari Belafonte. Leach ended each episode with a wish for his viewers that became his signature catchphrase, "champagne wishes and caviar dreams."

The theme song, titled "Come with Me Now" and performed by Bill Conti, is from a 1978 film called Five Days from Home.  It had also been used as one of the theme songs for local morning program AM Los Angeles on KABC-TV.

Synopsis
Lifestyles was one of the first shows to feature the lives of the wealthy. Later shows such as VH1's The Fabulous Life of... continued this trend. The show was largely intended to be an insight into the opulent residences and the glamorous lifestyles of those it profiled. However, many of the geographic areas it covered were ideal destinations for vacations, and in his on-camera appearances, Leach indirectly made references to resorts and tourist attractions. David Greenspan (a.k.a. David Perry), who was the voice-over narrator for most of the segments during the bulk of the show's run and could be heard whenever Leach did not appear on camera, made more direct references to such resorts and such tourist attractions.

Distribution
Lifestyles was created by Al Masini, who had also created Solid Gold, Entertainment Tonight, and Star Search; all of these were part of his Operation Prime Time project, which he later renamed Television Program Enterprises and later merged with Rysher Entertainment to form Rysher TPE, though neither Solid Gold nor Entertainment Tonight were ever syndicated by TPE or Rysher. All four programs are now owned by CBS Media Ventures.

Spinoff
Lifestyles had two companion spinoff series.  One was Runaway with the Rich and Famous, also hosted by Leach.  The series also aired in first-run syndication, from 1986 to 1994.  There was also Fame, Fortune and Romance, broadcast on ABC from 1986 to 1987.

Reboot
In 2013, the Style Network was going to reboot Lifestyles of The Rich and Famous but did not move forward when the network was later rebranded the Esquire Network. In 2014, a source said that a new version of Lifestyles would be remade for NBC, hosted by Nick Cannon. Unlike the original, this version would have mostly focused on Cannon's point of view as well as featured profiles of the mega-rich. This version would also have featured tech billionaires, who were quickly becoming the new face of wealth; it was said that philanthropic efforts would also be covered. Cannon said that "Robin Leach passed the torch to me, now I'm producing and hosting the new Lifestyles of the Rich and Famous"; he also said "You know what? I think rich and famous people take themselves too seriously, I'm gonna be just like I am on this show America's Got Talent. I'll be like, What the hell? Gold toilet seats? Let's pop bottles". The idea was later scrapped.

Merchandise
A board game called Lifestyles of the Rich and Famous: The Game was released by Pressman Toy Corporation in 1987.

A video slot machine was made by IGT in 2002.

References

External links

http://www.hollywood.com/tv/runaway-with-the-rich-and-famous-59508575/

1980s American television talk shows
1990s American television talk shows
1984 American television series debuts
1995 American television series endings
First-run syndicated television programs in the United States
Infotainment
ABC late-night programming
Television series created by Al Masini
Operation Prime Time
Television series by CBS Studios